John J. Harvey is a fireboat formerly of the New York City Fire Department in New York City, famed for returning to service following the September 11, 2001 attacks. She is among the most powerful fireboats ever built, capable of pumping up to 18,000 gallons of water a minute.

Launched in 1931, John J. Harvey had a distinguished career in the FDNY until her retirement in 1994. She was named for marine fireman John J. Harvey, killed when a ship exploded during a fire. Her official designation at the end of her career was Marine 2.

John J. Harvey was sold, at auction, in 1999, to a private consortium of marine preservationists determined to prevent her from being scrapped.  In June 2000 she was added to the National Park Service's National Register of Historic Places.  Her current owners have thoroughly restored her, and host frequent free trips on the river. She is currently moored at North River Pier 66, located at 12th Avenue and 26th Street on the Hudson River.

In 2018, she was repainted at the Caddell Dry Dock, Staten Island, in a red and white dazzle pattern as part of an art project by Tauba Auerbach, in commemoration of the dazzle camouflage used on World War I ships.

September 11, 2001
John J. Harvey had an unexpected encore. Shortly after the attacks on the World Trade Center on September 11, 2001, the boat's owners asked FDNY officials for permission to assist in maritime evacuations from Ground Zero. Meanwhile, firefighters had determined that the vast scale of destruction had damaged many fire mains, depriving fire crews of water. Officials radioed John J. Harvey, asking if her pumps still worked. Responding that they did, she was told to drop off her passengers as soon as possible and return to the disaster site, reactivating her official designation Marine 2. The National Trust for Historic Preservation gave John J. Harvey a special National Preservation Award to recognize this incident. John J. Harveys story was the subject of a 2002 children's book.

References
Notes

Further reading
 Fireboat: The Heroic Adventures of the John J. Harvey, by Maira Kalman, 2002. \

External links 
 
 
 
 

Service vessels of the United States
Fireboats of New York City
Historic American Engineering Record in New York (state)
Museum ships in New York (state)
Ships on the National Register of Historic Places in Manhattan
1931 ships
Museums in Manhattan
Firefighting museums in the United States
Port of New York and New Jersey
Chelsea, Manhattan
Ships built in Brooklyn